Ganapativarman ruled Kamarupa from the Varman dynasty for the period 446-470 A.D, was son of Kamrupi king Kalyanavarman and queen Gandharvavati. He married Yajnavati and had successor to throne named Mahendravarman.

See also
 Samudravarman
 Balavarman

References

Sources

 
 
 
 
 
 
 
 
 
 
 
 

Varman dynasty
5th-century Indian monarchs